Ella Ross (born 1 July 1992) is an Australian rules footballer who played for the Greater Western Sydney Giants in the AFL Women's competition. Ross was drafted by Greater Western Sydney with their 14th selection and 112th overall in the 2016 AFL Women's draft. She played every match in her debut season to finish with seven games. She was delisted at the end of the 2017 season. Ross spent 2018 playing with Richmond in the VFLW.

References

External links 

1992 births
Living people
Greater Western Sydney Giants (AFLW) players
Australian rules footballers from the Australian Capital Territory